Robert Lloyd may refer to:

 Robert Lloyd (of Rhiwgoch), Member of Parliament for Merioneth 1601
 Robert Lloyd (MP for Minehead), Member of Parliament for Minehead in 1621
 Robert Lloyd (1657–1709), Member of Parliament for Shropshire 1699–1702, 1705–8
 Robert Lloyd (died 1734), Member of Parliament for Shropshire 1710–3, 1722–7
 Robert Lloyd (poet) (1733–1764), British poet
 Bobby Lloyd (1888–1930), Welsh rugby union and rugby league footballer who played in the 1910s and 1920s  
 Robert Lloyd (bass) (born 1940), English opera singer (bass)
 Bob Lloyd (cricketer) (born 1947), Australian cricketer
 Bob Lloyd (rugby union) (born 1943), English rugby union footballer who played in the 1960s and 1970s
 Bob Lloyd (born 1946), American professional basketball player
 Robert Lloyd (Nightingales) (born 1959), lead singer of British post-punk band The Nightingales
 Rob Lloyd (property developer) (born 1964), British property developer
 Rob Lloyd (comedian) (born 1978), Australian comedian, actor and television presenter
 Rob Lloyd, CEO of Hyperloop One